Erie County is the name of three counties in the United States:

 Erie County, New York 
 Erie County, Pennsylvania
 Erie County, Ohio
All three counties are located alongside Lake Erie, one of the Great Lakes in North America. The counties were named after the Indigenous Erie people.

See also
 Erie Township (disambiguation)
 Erie (disambiguation)